Batley and Spen is a constituency in the House of Commons of the UK Parliament.

The current MP is Kim Leadbeater, a Labour politician, elected in a 2021 by-election by a 323-vote margin. The seat has returned Labour MPs since 1997.

Constituency profile
The area is in the rolling Pennines of West Yorkshire with considerable commerce, industry, retail and occupational trades.  A lower percentage of social housing is present than the regional average, however most of the larger settlements have some social housing. The population in the district is ethnically diverse. Many of the towns in the Spen Valley have few residents from non-white heritage backgrounds (Birstall, Birkenshaw, Cleckheaton, Liversedge and Gomersal, generally more suburban and Conservative areas, with the exception of Cleckheaton, which has Liberal Democrat councillors). However, the constituency's largest town, Batley, has a sizeable number of residents with South Asian backgrounds, namely Pakistani (9.2%) and Indian (mostly Gujarati) (15.9%). Heckmondwike also has a well-established South Asian community with 16.9% residents having Pakistani heritage.

The results of the last fifty years show marginal majorities for Labour and for the Conservatives, and is considered to be part of the "red wall".

In the 2016 EU referendum, Batley and Spen voted 60% in favour of Brexit.

Boundaries 

1983–1997: The Metropolitan Borough of Kirklees wards of Batley East, Batley West, Birstall and Birkenshaw, Cleckheaton, Heckmondwike, and Spen.
1997–2010: The Metropolitan Borough of Kirklees wards of Batley East, Batley West, Birstall and Birkenshaw, Cleckheaton, and Spen.
2010–present: The Metropolitan Borough of Kirklees wards of Batley East, Batley West, Birstall and Birkenshaw, Cleckheaton, Heckmondwike, and Liversedge and Gomersal.

The constituency was created in 1983 from parts of the seats of Batley and Morley, Brighouse and Spenborough and Dewsbury. This West Yorkshire constituency covers Batley, Birkenshaw, Birstall, Cleckheaton, East Bierley, Gomersal, Hunsworth, and Liversedge.

History
The constituency did not exist in its present form before 1983 and has seen significant boundary changes since its creation – most notably those that took effect for the 1997 general election.

Heckmondwike was part of the seat from its creation in 1983 until 1997, when it was transferred to Dewsbury. Heckmondwike was returned to Batley and Spen for the 2010 general election.

The seat swung in Labour's favour in the elections of 1997, 2001 and 2005 though the Conservatives reduced the Labour majority in 2010 with a swing below the national average.

The electoral ward of Heckmondwike (which includes part of Liversedge) was considered part of the Spen Valley (although it was not part of the former Spenborough Urban District). Heckmondwike ward was for many years a Labour stronghold, but in the 2000s elected two BNP councillors. The BNP councillors were narrowly defeated by Labour in 2007 and 2008.

A by-election in 2016 occurred after the murder of Jo Cox, the sitting MP. Cox was killed on 16 June 2016 after being shot and stabbed multiple times by a man associated with far-right organisations. The Conservative Party, Liberal Democrats, UK Independence Party and the Green Party announced they would not contest the by-election as a mark of respect.

Another by-election occurred in 2021 following the resignation of Tracy Brabin MP, who was elected Mayor of West Yorkshire on 10 May. The 2021 by-election received considerable media attention because of expectations of a Labour loss following the earlier Hartlepool by-election and a high-profile and divisive campaign by George Galloway for the Workers Party of Britain. The by-election was won by Jo Cox's sister, Kim Leadbeater, with a reduced majority.

Members of Parliament

Elections

Elections in the 2020s 

A by-election was held on 1 July 2021 following the resignation of MP Tracy Brabin to become Mayor of West Yorkshire.

Elections in the 2010s 
 

a.  Swing is calculated from the 2015 election, not the 2016 by-election which was not contested by major parties. Aleks Lukic's vote change is in comparison to the 2015 election, when he stood as a UKIP candidate.

Elections in the 2000s

Elections in the 1990s

Elections in the 1980s

See also 
 List of parliamentary constituencies in West Yorkshire

Notes

References

Parliamentary constituencies in Yorkshire and the Humber
Constituencies of the Parliament of the United Kingdom established in 1983
Politics of Kirklees